Austria was the typeface formerly used on all official road signage in Austria made prior to 2010. A modified version of its German counterpart DIN 1451, it came in narrow- and medium-width fonts. Since 2010 it has been replaced on all new road signs by the more recently developed TERN (Trans-European Road Network) typeface.

See also
List of public signage typefaces

References

Grotesque sans-serif typefaces
Government typefaces
Typefaces and fonts introduced in 2010
Display typefaces